Paul Laporte (born 9 May 1928) was a Canadian sports shooter. He competed in the mixed skeet event at the 1976 Summer Olympics.

References

1928 births
Living people
Canadian male sport shooters
Olympic shooters of Canada
Shooters at the 1976 Summer Olympics
People from Edmundston
Sportspeople from New Brunswick
20th-century Canadian people